Qhnnnl (stylized as qhnnnl) is the fourth album from Dianogah and was released on June 10, 2008.

Track listing
 Oneone 
 A Breaks B
 Qhnnnl
 Andrew Jackson
 Sprinter
 I Like Juice In a Shark Suit
 Es Posible Fuego?
 You Might Go Off
 Snowpants 
 Puma
 Song You Hate
 Mongrel

Notes

2008 albums
Dianogah albums